The 3rd National People's Congress was in session from 1964 to 1975. It held only one session in the ten years.

The session was held from December 21, 1964, till January 4, 1965. The Congress elected the state leaders:

President of the People's Republic of China: Liu Shaoqi
Vice President of the People's Republic of China: Soong Ching-ling and Dong Biwu
Chairman of the Standing Committee of the National People's Congress: Zhu De
Premier of the State Council: Zhou Enlai
President of the Supreme People's Court: Yang Xiufeng
Procurator-General of the Supreme People's Procuratorate: Zhang Dingcheng

External links
 Official website of the NPC

National People's Congresses
1964 in China